A glucan is a polysaccharide derived from D-glucose, linked by glycosidic bonds. Glucans are noted in two forms: alpha glucans and beta glucans. Many beta-glucans are medically important. They represent a drug target for antifungal medications of the echinocandin class.

Types 
The following are glucans (The α- and β- and numbers clarify the type of O-glycosidic bond and the specific carbons involved):

Alpha 

 dextran, α-1,6-glucan with α-1,3-branches
 floridean starch, α-1,4- and α-1,6-glucan
 glycogen, α-1,4- and α-1,6-glucan
 pullulan, α-1,4- and α-1,6-glucan
 starch, a mixture of amylose and amylopectin, both α-1,4- and α-1,6-glucans

Beta 

 cellulose, β-1,4-glucan
 chrysolaminarin, β-1,3-glucan
 curdlan, β-1,3-glucan
 laminarin, β-1,3- and β-1,6-glucan
 lentinan, a strictly purified β-1,6:β-1,3-glucan from Lentinus edodes
 lichenin, β-1,3- and β-1,4-glucan
 oat beta-glucan, β-1,3- and β-1,4-glucan
 pleuran, β-1,3- and β-1,6-glucan isolated from Pleurotus ostreatus
 zymosan, β-1,3-glucan

Properties 
Properties of glucans include resistance to oral acids/enzyme and water insolubility. Glucans extracted from grains tend to be both soluble and insoluble.

Structure
Glucans are polysaccharides derived from glucose monomers.  The monomers are linked by glycosidic bonds. Four types of glucose-based polysaccharides are possible: 1,6- (starch), 1,4- (cellulose), 1,3- (laminarin), and 1,2-bonded glucans.

The first representatives of main chain unhydrolysable linear polymers made up of levoglucosan units were synthesized in 1985 by anionic polymerization of 2,3-epoxy derivatives of levoglucosan (1,6;2,3-dianhydro-4-O-alkyl-β-D-mannopyranoses).

A wide range of unique monomers with different radical R can be synthesized. There were synthesized polymers with R= -CH3, -CH2CHCH2, and -CH2C6H5. Investigation of the polymerization kinetics of those derivatives, molecular weight and  molecular-weight distribution showed that the polymerization has the features of a living polymerization system. The process takes place without termination and transfer of the polymer chain with a degree of polymerization equal to the mole ratio of the monomer to the initiator. Accordingly, the upper value molecular weight polymer determines only degree of purification system what determine the presence in the system uncontrollable amount of terminators of polymer chains.

Poly(2-3)-D-glucose was synthesized proceeds by transformation of benzyl (R= -CH2C6H5) functionalized polymer.

Polymerization of 3,4-epoxy levoglucosan (1,6;3,4-dianhydro-2-O-alkyl-β-D-galactopyranose) results in formation 3,4-bounded levoglucosan polymer.

The presence of 1,6-anhydro structure in every unit of polymer chains allows researchers to apply all spectra of well developed methods of carbohydrate chemistry with formation of highly intriguing biological application polymers.
The polymers are the only known regular polyethers built up of carbohydrate units in main polymer chain.

Functions 
Glucans serve a diverse set of functions. Within the cell, certain glucans store energy, fortify cellular structure, behave in recognition, and enhance virulence in pathogenic organisms.

Glycogen and starch are notable glucans responsible for storing energy for the cell. Receptor molecules of the immune system, such as the Complement receptor 3, or CR3, and CD5 receptor, recognize and bind to beta-glucans on invading cell surfaces.

See also 
 Glucanase

References 

Polysaccharides